Khouloud Mansy (born 22 July 1998) is an Egyptian sailor. She competed in the Laser Radial event at the 2020 Summer Olympics.

References

External links
 
 
 

1998 births
Living people
Egyptian female sailors (sport)
Olympic sailors of Egypt
Sailors at the 2020 Summer Olympics – Laser Radial
Place of birth missing (living people)
Sailors at the 2014 Summer Youth Olympics